Ewen Donald McLennan (3 August 1861 – 14 December 1948) was a Reform Party Member of Parliament.

He won the Franklin electorate in a 1925 by-election after the death of the previous MP, Prime Minister William Massey and retired in 1928.

References

1861 births
1948 deaths
Members of the New Zealand House of Representatives
New Zealand MPs for North Island electorates
Reform Party (New Zealand) MPs